The 2004–05 Munster Rugby season was Munster's fourth season competing in the Celtic League, alongside which they also competed in the Heineken Cup. It was Alan Gaffney's second and final season as head coach.

2004–05 squad

Pre-season

2004–05 Celtic League

2004–05 Celtic Cup

Quarter-final

Semi-final

Final

2004–05 Heineken Cup

Pool 4

Quarter-final

References

External links
2004–05 Munster Rugby season official site 

2004–05
2004–05 in Irish rugby union